The Royal Norwegian Ministry of Transportation is a Norwegian ministry established in 1946, and is responsible for transportation in Norway. The ministry was responsible for communication infrastructure until may 2019, when the responsibility for the Norwegian Communications Authority was transferred to Ministry of Local Government and Regional Development. Since October 2021, the ministry has been headed by Jon-Ivar Nygård (Labour Party). The department must report to the parliament (Stortinget).

Organization

The ministry has 135 employees and is divided into the following sections:
 Political staff
 Communication Unit
 Department of Management, Administration and Public Safety and Security
 Department of Civil Aviation, Postal services and Procurement of Non-Commercial Transport
 Department of Planning and Rail transport
 Department of Coastal Affairs and Environment
 Department of Public Roads, Urban Mobility and Traffic Safety

Political staff
 State Secretary Ingelin Noresjø (Christian Democratic Party)
 State Secretary Ingvild Ofte Arntsen (Christian Democratic Party)
 State Secretary John-Ragnar Aarset (Conservative Party)
 Political Adviser Stig-Øyvind Blystad (Christian Democratic Party)

Subsidiaries
Under the ministry there are seven administrative agencies and four state-owned limited companies:
 Avinor (Airport operator, company)
 Bane NOR (Railway infrastructure, company)
 Baneservice (Construction, company)
 Norwegian Accident Investigation Board
 Norwegian Civil Aviation Authority
 Norwegian Railway Directorate
 Norwegian Railway Inspectorate
 Technical Supervisory Authority for Cableways
 Vygruppen AS (Vy) (company)
 Entur AS (company)
 Posten (Postal service, company)
 Statens Vegvesen (Public Roads Administration)
The department owned 1/3 of Stor-Oslo Lokaltrafikk that organised the public transport in Akershus.

Note: The railway company Airport Express Train, the Norwegian Maritime Directorate and the Norwegian Ship Registers are subsidiaries of the Norwegian Ministry of Trade and Industry while Kystverket is a subsidiary of the Norwegian Ministry of Fisheries and Coastal Affairs.

See also

List of Norwegian Ministers of Transport

References

External links
 Official web site

 
Transport and Communications
Transport authorities of Norway
1946 establishments in Norway
Ministries established in 1946
Norway
Norway